Tarachand Bhagora is an Indian politician belonging to the Indian National Congress. He was elected to the Lok Sabha, the lower house of the Parliament of India from Banswara, Rajasthan in 1996,1999 and 2009.

References

External links
 Official biographical sketch in Parliament of India website

Indian National Congress politicians
Living people
1954 births
India MPs 1996–1997
India MPs 1999–2004
India MPs 2009–2014
Lok Sabha members from Rajasthan
People from Banswara district
Indian National Congress politicians from Rajasthan